Juan Ebodio Gonzalez (born February 22, 1967) is a Mexican Luchador enmascarado better known under the ring name Psicosis. Gonzalez was the second wrestler to work as Psicosis, given the ring character by Asistencia Asesoría y Administración (AAA) to replace the original Psicosis, and is often denoted Psicosis II. When Gonzalez left AAA in early 2009 he was briefly replaced by a third Psicosis. He was not referred to as "Psicosis II" on promotional material, instead the name is used to distinguish himself from the original Psicosis. In November 2013, Gonzalez was renamed Psyco Ripper and shortly thereafter Reapper.

Professional wrestling career

Early career
Juan Gonzalez was trained by his father, who wrestled under the ring name El Puma. Upon his debut he began working as El Puma, Jr., mainly in the Puebla region and in Tijuana, Baja California. When he began wrestling in Tijuana in 1994 he received additional training by Rey Misterio, Sr. and also adopted the ring persona "León Negro" (Spanish for "Black Lion"), a rúdo (bad guy) mid-card character. In 1995 he travelled to Japan and worked for Frontier Martial Arts Wrestling (FMW) teaming with Ultraman as Ultraman-Taro for the tour. Another wrestler later worked as Ultra Taro, Jr. in Southern California, but he is not related to Gonzalez. In January 1996 Gonzalez lost the León Negro mask twice, both times by losing a Lucha de Apuesta to Halloween, once in Tijuana and once in San Luis Río Colorado, Sonora. Gonzalez became noticed by Asistencia Asesoría y Administración (AAA) owner Antonio Peña through his work in Tijuana and landed a full-time contract with the company in 1997.

AAA

Los Vipers (1997–2009)

Gonzalez was brought into AAA initially still with the Leon Negro gimmick. At Triplemanía V-A he won the hair of both Halcon Dorado, Jr. and May Flowers, teaming with Heavy Metal. Later that year he was chosen to replace the original Psicosis who was wrestling full-time in World Championship Wrestling (WCW) at the time, so Antonio Peña needed someone to take over the very popular character in AAA. He made his debut as Psicosis in mid-1998 siding with Los Vipers leader Cibernético and quickly became a core member of Los Vipers. On August 23, 1998, Psicosis, Histeria, Maniaco, and Mosco de la Merced teamed up to participate in a tournament for the vacant Mexican National Atómicos Championship, representing Los Vipers. Los Vipers won the tournament by defeating Los Payasos (Coco Amarillo, Coco Azul, Coco Negro, and Coco Rojo) in the finals to win the Atómicos title. Over the following months Los Vipers began a storyline feud with another group called Los Vatos Locos, which at the time consisted of Charly Manson, May Flowers, Nygma, and Picudo. On February 14, 1999, Los Vatos Locos defeated Los Vipers to win the Atómicos championship. Los Vipers won the title a second time on September 17, 1999, when they defeated Los Junior Atómicos (Blue Demon Jr., La Parka Jr., Mascara Sagrada Jr. and Perro Aguayo Jr.). Los Vatos Locos managed to end Los Vipers second reign only three months later as they defeated Psicosis and partners on the undercard of the 1999 Guerra de Titanes show. Los Vipers regained the Atómicos title on April 15, 2000. effectively ending the storyline with Los Vatos Locos. Los Vipers reigned as Atómicos champions for over a year, until they were surprisingly upset by a little-known group called Los Regio Guapos (Hator, Monje Negro, Jr., Potro, Jr.. and Tigre Universitario) on August 19, 2001. Los Regio Guapos only held the title for under two months before Los Vipers regained the title and began their fourth reign with the Atómicos title. Their fourth reign also turned out to be the last reign for Los Vipers, ending on November 23, 2001, as a new version of Los Vatos Locos (Espiritu, Nygma, Picudo and Silver Cat) defeated them in one of the featured matches of the 2001 Guerra de Titanes. Following the loss both Maniaco and Mosco de la Merced began appearing less and less for AAA. On August 13, 2002, Psicosis won his first singles championship as he defeated Pimpinela Escarlata to win the Mexican National Middleweight Championship. His reign as Middleweight champion was characterized by long periods where the title was not even defended, stretching his title reign out for almost three years. During this time period Psicosis turned técnico as he joined "The Mexican Powers" along with Juventud Guerrera, Crazy Boy, and Joe Líder. In early 2005 the original Psicosis returned to AAA and immediately began a storyline with Psicosis II over the rights to the name. The storyline included a steel cage match that took place at Triplemanía XIII, but ended in a no contest as Psicosis II's former partner Histeria interfered in the match when he attacked both wrestlers. Subsequently, the feud over the Psicosis name became a three-way feud between the Original Psicosis, Psicosis II, and Histeria. On August 3, 2005, Psicosis II successfully defended the Mexican Middleweight title against Histeria in a hardcore match. Following the match the Mexico City Boxing and Wrestling Commission, who regulate the Mexican National championships, stripped Psicosis II of the title since the rules state that Mexican National Championships can only be defended in regular matches, not Hardcore matches. The feud for the Psicosis name ended with Histeria winning a ladder match, earning the rights to the name. Histeria later handed the rights over to Antonio Peña, who decided to allow Psicosis II to keep the ring character, making the storyline a moot point. On October 18, 2006, The Mexican Powers defeated The Black Family (Cuervo, Chessman, Escoria, and Ozz) to win the Mexican National Atómicos Championship, Psicosis II's fifth reign. On May 20, 2007, Psicosis II turned on his partners during a title defense, allowing La Secta de Mesias (Cuervo, Escoria, Espiritu, and Ozz) to win the title. Psicosis II joined Histeria and Abismo Negro to reform Los Vipers, this time called Viper's Revolucion. Later on when Mr. Niebla joined the group both Psicosis and Histeria sided with him and kicked Abismo Negro out of the group. Viper's Revolucion was later joined by Black Abyss, an Abismo Negro clone. The feud with Abismo Negro was supposed to be settled at Triplemanía XVI in a cage match, but it was cancelled in the weeks leading up to the event, followed by Mr. Niebla leaving AAA. Following Mr. Niebla's defection from AAA Psicosis II, Histeria, and Black Abyss were used less frequently and not in any long term storylines.

Independent circuit (2009–2010)
In the summer of 2009 both Psicosis II and Histeria left AAA, citing their dissatisfaction with the lack of bookings and thus lack of pay. They began wrestling on the independent circuit still using the names Psicosis and Histeria, although they later modified their names to "Psicosis Extreme" and "Histeria Extreme" when AAA started making threats about legal sanctions. The pair worked for a number of promotions including International Wrestling Revolution Group (IWRG) and were regulars for the Perros del Mal wrestling promotion.

Consejo Mundial de Lucha Libre

Los Invasores (2010–2017)

On April 12, 2010, a contingent of former AAA wrestlers including Psicosis II, Histeria, Maniaco, El Alebrije, and Cuije appeared on a Consejo Mundial de Lucha Libre (CMLL) show in Puebla, Puebla. The group drove into the arena in a black SUV and attacked La Sombra, El Hijo del Fantasma, and La Máscara following a match. Brazo de Plata, Místico, and Jon Strongman tried to help out but were kept away by CMLL rudos Averno, El Texano, Jr., and El Terrible. Following the attack the former AAA wrestlers returned to the SUV and left the arena. The group made several subsequent attacks during CMLL shows, including running in during their Sunday Night Arena México show, indicating that the storyline was not limited to just the Puebla area. After weeks of run-ins the group, dubbed Los Independientes or "The Independents" after the "Independent circuit", wrestled their first match for CMLL. In their debut for CMLL on April 26, 2010, El Alebrije, Histeria and Psicosis defeated El Hijo del Fantasma, La Mascara, and La Sombra. Since the beginning of the "Los Independientes" storyline neither Psicosis nor Histeria have worked on Perro del Mal events. On May 10, 2010, during a match between Los Independientes and CMLL wrestlers former CMLL and AAA wrestlers Universo 2000 and Máscara Año 2000 ran in to help Los Independientes beat up on their opponents, taking their side in the storyline between independent wrestlers and CMLL. Psicosis was the first wrestler to face a CMLL wrestler in singles competition, when he lost to El Hijo del Fantasma by disqualification. The team was later renamed Los Invasores. During a trios match between El Alebrije, Histeria II, and Maniaco and the team of Héctor Garza, Brazo de Plata, and Toscano, Garza turned on his team mates and joined Los Invasores. On May 16, 2010, Psicosis wrestled against La Sombra in a match that saw the surprise appearance of both Mr. Águila and Rayo de Jalisco, Jr. Mr. Águila returned to CMLL to side with Los Independientes while Rayo de Jalisco, Jr. ended up siding with CMLL in their war against the outsider group. The following day in Arena Coliseo Olímpico returned to CMLL and attacked Máximo during the main event of the show; at the time it was not clear if he had actually joined the group of outsiders or not. CMLL later held a press conference announcing that they would hold a special Sin Salida event on June 6, 2010, that would center around the Los Invasores vs. CMLL storyline. During the press conference Olímpico was part of the Invasores group. It was also announced that Garza and Mr. Águila were the co-leaders of the group. On August 16, 2010, it was announced that Psicosis was one of 14 men putting their mask on the line in a Luchas de Apuestas steel cage match, the main event of the CMLL 77th Anniversary Show. Psicosis II was the 12th and last man to leave the steel cage, opting to keep his mask safe instead of helping fellow Invasor Olímpico out. The match came down to La Sombra pinning Olímpico to unmask him. On September 20, 2011, Psicosis II, Olímpico, and the new leader of Los Invasores, Volador Jr., defeated Ángel de Oro, Diamante, and Rush to win the Mexican National Trios Championship. They lost the title to Atlantis, Delta, and Guerrero Maya, Jr. on December 16, 2011. Psicosis II, this time teaming with Los Invasores members Kraneo and Mr. Águila, regained the title from Los Reyes de la Atlantida on December 16, 2012. They then lost the title to La Máscara, Rush and Titán on June 30, 2013. In November 2013, Psicosis II was renamed Psyco Ripper. The following month, his ring name was changed to Reapper.

Return to AAA (2017–present)
In 2017, Psicosis II announced he would be coming back for the 30 Man Ruleta Rusa at Triplemanía XXV. At the event, Psicosis, as part of Los Vipers, was defeated by Team Parka (Argenis, Bengala and La Parka).

AAA lawsuit
In early April 2010, Psicosis, Histeria, and El Alebrije sought legal action against AAA over the issues of name and ring character ownership as well as unfair termination by AAA. The two claim that they have wrestled for 13 years to create the characters and thus own them. The parties met in Mexico City's Board of Conciliation and Arbitration to see if a settlement could be reached or if the matter would be taken to court. The parties met for a second arbitration meeting in late April 2010. This time the plaintiff group was joined by Latin Lover who, like Alebrije, Histeria and the others, claimed that he should be allowed to use the name since he has worked as Latin Lover for 18 years and thus should be allowed to continue using it. After the meeting it was stated that all parties involved were cooperating over the matter. El Alebrije, Histeria and Psicosis II have all since been renamed by CMLL.

Championships and accomplishments
Asistencia Asesoría y Administración
Mexican National Atómicos Championship (5 times) – with Histeria, Mosco de la Merced II and Maniaco (4), Crazy Boy, Joe Líder and Juventud Guerrera)
Mexican National Middleweight Championship (1 time)
Consejo Mundial de Lucha Libre
Mexican National Trios Championship (2 times) – with Olímpico and Volador Jr. (1), and Kraneo and Mr. Águila (1)
Pro Wrestling Illustrated
PWI ranked him #229 of the top 500 wrestlers in the PWI 500 in 2012

Luchas de Apuestas record

Footnotes

References

1967 births
Living people
Masked wrestlers
Mexican male professional wrestlers
Professional wrestlers from Puebla
People from Puebla (city)
Mexican National Atómicos Champions
20th-century professional wrestlers
21st-century professional wrestlers
Mexican National Middleweight Champions
Mexican National Trios Champions